The Wellness Community (TWC) is an international, non-profit organization that provides support and education to people with cancer and those who care for them. It was founded in Santa Monica in 1982 by Harold Benjamin, his wife Harriet Benjamin and Shannon McGowan. In addition to providing support groups, education and other programs, TWC conducts research to quantify and document the benefits of psychosocial support for people with cancer.  Research is done in collaboration with Catholic University, M.D. Anderson Cancer Center, Rutgers University, Stanford University, University of California, Los Angeles, and University of California, San Francisco.  In 2009, it merged with Gilda's Club to form the Cancer Support Community.

References 

 Wall Street Journal, Laura Landro "Cancer Patients Find Support" Wednesday, November 27, 2007.
 Institute of Medicine, "Cancer Care for the Whole Patient: Meeting the Psychosocial Needs" http://www.iom.edu/?id=47228

External links 
 

Cancer organizations based in the United States
Medical and health organizations based in California